Soltanabad (also Romanized as Solţānābād; also known as Solţān and Sultānābād) is a village in Rudshur Rural District, in the Central District of Zarandieh County, Markazi Province, Iran. At the 2006 census, its population was 157, in 46 families.

References 

Populated places in Zarandieh County